Detlef Struve (May 12, 1903 – May 25, 1987) was a German politician of the Christian Democratic Union (CDU) and former member of the German Bundestag.

Life 
Struve belonged to the district council of the district of Rendsburg and was president of this local parliament from May 1950. From 1947 to 1949, he was a member of the Economic Council for the Bizone and was a member of the German Bundestag from its first election in 1949 to 1972. There he represented the electoral district of Rendsburg and from 1965 the electoral district of Rendsburg-Neumünster. Most recently he achieved 49.4% of the first votes there.

From 1957 to 1972 Struve was deputy chairman of the CDU/CSU parliamentary group in the Bundestag.

Literature

References

1903 births
1987 deaths
Members of the Bundestag for Schleswig-Holstein
Members of the Bundestag 1969–1972
Members of the Bundestag 1965–1969
Members of the Bundestag 1961–1965
Members of the Bundestag 1957–1961
Members of the Bundestag 1953–1957
Members of the Bundestag 1949–1953
Members of the Bundestag for the Christian Democratic Union of Germany